Luisenstadt is a former quarter (Stadtteil) of central Berlin, now divided between the present localities of Mitte and Kreuzberg. It gave its name to the Luisenstadt Canal and the Luisenstädtische Kirche.

History
The area of the neighbourhood was originally named Myrica and was acquired in 1261 by the city of Cölln.

Geography
Luisenstadt is bounded on the north by the river Spree, in the west by the Lindenstraße (in Friedrichstadt), and in the south by the Landwehrkanal. A smaller part of the zone now belongs to Mitte (in the same-named district) and the greater part to Kreuzberg (in Friedrichshain-Kreuzberg district).

Main sights
Emmaus Church
Evangelical-Lutheran (Old-Lutheran) Church
Görlitzer Bahnhof
St. Jacob's Church
Jannowitzbrücke
Kottbusser Tor
Lausitzer Platz
Luisenstadt Canal
Luisenstadt Church
Mariannenplatz
St. Michael's Church
Moritzplatz
Oberbaumbrücke
Oranienplatz
St. Thomas Church
Wassertorplatz

References

External links
 Luisenstadt civic association
 Luisenstadt cultural website
Map of Luisenstadt on Berlin official site

Friedrichshain-Kreuzberg
Mitte
Zones of Berlin